Kingston upon Hull East is a borough constituency for the House of Commons of the Parliament of the United Kingdom. It elects one Member of Parliament (MP) at least once every five years by the first-past-the-post electoral system. The constituency has been represented by Karl Turner of the Labour Party since the 2010 general election.

Boundaries

1885–1918: The Municipal Borough of Hull wards of Alexandra, Beverley, Drypool, Sutton, and part of Central.

1918–1950: The County Borough of Hull wards of Alexandra, Drypool, and Southcoates.

1950–1955: The County Borough of Hull wards of Alexandra, Drypool, Marfleet, Southcoates, Stoneferry, and Sutton.

1955–1974: The County Borough of Hull wards of Alexandra, Drypool, East Central, Marfleet, Myton, Southcoates, Stoneferry, and Sutton.

1974–1983: The County Borough of Hull wards of Bransholme, Drypool, Greatfield, Holderness, Longhill, Marfleet, Stoneferry, and Sutton.

1983–2010:  The City of Hull wards of Drypool, Holderness, Ings, Longhill, Marfleet, Southcoates, and Sutton.

2010–present:  The City of Hull wards of Drypool, Holderness, Ings, Longhill, Marfleet, Southcoates East, Southcoates West, and Sutton.

Constituency profile
The constituency covers most of the city of Kingston upon Hull east of the River Hull, excluding the Bransholme estate which lies in the Kingston upon Hull North constituency. It is a constituency of diversity; divided by Holderness Road, it can be split into two very separate areas. It includes the now-redeveloped residential Victoria Docks, which can be considered alongside Sutton Village, Garden Village and the private housing suburbs to the north of East Park. Away from the prestigious dockside developments and middle-class suburbs, the southern area of the constituency is largely social housing with a large amount of unemployment and underemployment alongside the vast docks and industrial estates.

History
In the early years of the constituency, it continually changed hands between the Conservative Party and the then-Liberal Party. Kingston upon Hull East has returned Labour MPs since 1935, and from 1945 to 2010 was represented by only two members, former seamen, Harry Pursey and John Prescott (who became Deputy Prime Minister, at the time in charge of town and country planning policy).

Members of Parliament

Elections

Elections in the 2010s

The turnout of 49.3% in Kingston upon Hull East was the lowest in any constituency in the United Kingdom at the 2019 general election, and was the only example of a seat where fewer than half of the eligible electorate voted. It was also the seat with the lowest number of votes for a winning candidate in England.

Elections in the 2000s

Elections in the 1990s

Elections in the 1980s

Elections in the 1970s

Elections in the 1960s

Elections in the 1950s

Election in the 1940s

Elections in the 1930s

Elections in the 1920s

Elections in the 1910s

Elections in the 1900s

Elections in the 1890s

Elections in the 1880s

See also
List of parliamentary constituencies in Humberside

References

Politics of Kingston upon Hull
Parliamentary constituencies in Yorkshire and the Humber
Constituencies of the Parliament of the United Kingdom established in 1885